Lotería del crimen (Crime Lottery) is a Mexican thriller detective drama television series produced by Adrián Ortega Echegollén and Rodrigo Hernández Cruz for TV Azteca in 2022, The series centered on a detective group attached to a police intelligence unit where they have to solve clues to find the criminals. The series premiered on Azteca 7 on October 10, 2022.

It stars Claudio Lafarga as Bruno Barraza and Julieta Grajales as Victoria Vargas, along with a ensemble cast.

Plot 
Police detectives Bruno Barraza and Victoria Vargas, belonging to the UNIC (Unidad de Inteligencia Criminal; i.e: Criminal Intelligence Unit), try to discover several murderers who are still on the loose in Mexico City and continue to commit more murders, and which they must stop.

Cast 
Claudio Lafarga as Bruno Barraza
Julieta Grajales as Victoria Vargas
Arnoldo Picazzo as Elogio Enciso
 as Ricardo Romero "El Recio"
Tamara Niño de Rivera as Sofía Salabeth
 as Marieta "Mari" Martínez
Jerry Velázquez as Jonathan Yáñez
Jorge Fink as Tito Tavares
Tatiana del Real as Luisa López
Angélica Lara as Nancy Delfina

Production 
It was announced on February 2, 2022 Sandra Smester, then vice president of Azteca Uno and general director of content and distribution of TV Azteca announced in an interview, for the newly programming of the main channels of the television station announcing Lotería del crimen as one of the fiction productions, the production of the series began filming on June 27, 2022. The stage direction and cameras are in charge of the filmmaker Carlos Carrera and the photography is in charge of Ricardo Garfias, For the first season the series has 24 episodes contemplated for broadcast.

Ratings

Episodes

Season 1

References

External links 
 
 

2022 Mexican television series debuts
Azteca 7 original programming
Mexican crime television series
Thriller television series
Detective television series
Television series by TV Azteca
Mexican LGBT-related television shows